The Deputy Prime Minister of the Lao People's Democratic Republic is the deputy chief executive and the rank below the Prime Minister. The office of Deputy Prime Minister was officially created as a ministerial portfolio on 2 December 1975. A Deputy Prime Minister is appointed on the orders of the sitting Prime Minister.

The present officeholders are Bounthong Chitmany and Somdy Duangdy, were elected to office on 20 April 2016 by the 1st Plenary Session of the 8th National Assembly.

Officeholders

References

Laotian ministers